Merkurosaurus is an extinct genus of lizards from the Shinisauria that is known from the Late Oligocene of Germany, collected in 1999, and the Early Miocene Most Formation of the Czech Republic (west Bohemia) and the Wiesbaden Formation Germany of (Amöneburg). A single species, M. ornatus, is known and was named and described by Jozef Klembara in 2008 based on the holotype Pb 02045 and other referred specimens. It was initially only known from deposits in the Czech Republic but remains found in Germany were eventually attributed to the genus in 2015.

References 

Anguimorpha
Lizards
Fossil taxa described in 2008